Iraqw may refer to:
Iraqw people
Iraqw language

Language and nationality disambiguation pages